Dobrovelychkivskyi Raion was a raion (district) of Kirovohrad Oblast in central Ukraine. The administrative center of the district was the urban-type settlement of Dobrovelychkivka. The raion was abolished on 18 July 2020 as part of the administrative reform of Ukraine, which reduced the number of raions of Kirovohrad Oblast to four. The area of Dobrovelychkivka Raion was merged into Novoukrainka Raion.

At the time of disestablishment, the raion consisted of four hromadas: 
 Dobrovelychkivka settlement hromada with the administration in Dobrovelychkivka;
 Pishchanyi Brid rural hromada with the administration in the selo of Pishchanyi Brid;
 Pomichna urban hromada with the administration in the city of Pomichna;
 Tyshkivka rural hromada with the administration in the selo of Tyshkivka.

References

Former raions of Kirovohrad Oblast
1923 establishments in Ukraine
Ukrainian raions abolished during the 2020 administrative reform